Ahmed Ebrahim Yusuf Al Hujairi (born February 1, 1978) is a Bahraini footballer. He currently plays for Al-Ahli of Bahrain as well as the Bahrain national football team.

National team career statistics

Goals for Senior National Team

External links
 

1978 births
Living people
Bahraini footballers
Sportspeople from Manama
Association football defenders
Bahrain international footballers